Alexander Svetov-Nevolin is a paralympic swimmer from Russia competing mainly in category S12 events.

Career 
Alexander travelled with Russian Paralympic team to Beijing for the 2008 Summer Paralympics.  There he won a bronze medal in the 100m freestyle, silver behind Ukrainian Maksym Veraksa who set  world records in both the 50m freestyle and 200m individual medley and broke the world record himself in winning the 100m backstroke.

In October 2014 Russian newspaper Sovershenno Sekretno published an article claiming that Alexander's paralympic status is falsified. The article included a copy of Alexander's driving license, a copy of a police car incident report listing Nevolin-Svetlov as the driver, and the details of a 2013 bribery case against an ophthalmologist allegedly requesting a bribe from Nevolin-Svetlov for confirming the paralympic status.

References

External links
 

Paralympic swimmers of Russia
Swimmers at the 2008 Summer Paralympics
Swimmers at the 2012 Summer Paralympics
Paralympic gold medalists for Russia
Paralympic silver medalists for Russia
Paralympic bronze medalists for Russia
Russian male freestyle swimmers
Living people
Medalists at the 2008 Summer Paralympics
Medalists at the 2012 Summer Paralympics
S12-classified Paralympic swimmers
Year of birth missing (living people)
Medalists at the World Para Swimming European Championships
Paralympic medalists in swimming
Russian male backstroke swimmers
Russian male medley swimmers
20th-century Russian people
21st-century Russian people